FC Bazenheid is a football team based in Bazenheid, Switzerland. They play in the 2. Liga Interregional, currently the highest tier they reached within the Swiss football pyramid.

Former players include Elsad Zverotic and Philipp Muntwiler.

References

External links
  Official Website

Association football clubs established in 1938
Bazenheid,FC
1938 establishments in Switzerland